The short-faced mole (Scaptochirus moschatus) is a species of mammal in the family Talpidae. It is the only species within the genus Scaptochirus. It is endemic to China.

References

Talpidae
Mammals of China
Mammals described in 1867
Taxonomy articles created by Polbot